Sid 'Sandy' Kaufman (1891-1971) was an Australian professional rugby league footballer who played in the New South Wales Rugby League (NSWRL) competition.

Playing career
Kaufman played for the Eastern Suburbs club in the years(1918–1924). A halfback 'Sandy' was a member of Easts 4th premiership winning side in 1923.

In the 1919 season, Kaufman represented New South Wales.

References

The Encyclopedia Of Rugby League; Alan Whiticker & Glen Hudson

Australian rugby league players
Sydney Roosters players
1891 births
1971 deaths
Rugby league halfbacks
New South Wales rugby league team players
Rugby league players from Sydney